Shahrun Yusifova, born March 23, 1984, is a female Azerbaijani Taekwondo practitioner.

References

1984 births
Living people
Azerbaijani female taekwondo practitioners
European Taekwondo Championships medalists
21st-century Azerbaijani women
20th-century Azerbaijani women